A remote manipulator, also known as a telefactor, telemanipulator, or waldo (after the 1942 short story "Waldo" by Robert A. Heinlein which features a man who invents and uses such devices), is a device which, through electronic, hydraulic, or mechanical linkages, allows a hand-like mechanism to be controlled by a human operator. The purpose of such a device is usually to move or manipulate hazardous materials for reasons of safety, similar to the operation and play of a claw crane game.

History

In 1945, the company Central Research Laboratories was given the contract to develop a remote manipulator for the Argonne National Laboratory.  The intent was to replace devices which manipulated highly radioactive materials from above a sealed chamber or hot cell, with a mechanism which operated through the side wall of the chamber, allowing a researcher to stand normally while working.

The result was the Master-Slave Manipulator Mk. 8, or MSM-8, which became the iconic remote manipulator seen in newsreels and movies, such as the Andromeda Strain or THX 1138.

Robert A. Heinlein claimed a much earlier origin for remote manipulators. He wrote that he got the idea for "waldos" after reading a 1918 article in Popular Mechanics about "a poor fellow afflicted with myasthenia gravis ... [who] devised complicated lever arrangements to enable him to use what little strength he had."

See also
 Glovebox
 Dextre
 Teleoperation
 Telerobotics
 Master/slave (technology)
 Avatar (computing)
 Pantograph

References

External links

 Central Research Laboratories web site
 A video of a Remote Manipulator being used to make an origami crane 
 Master-slave manipulator at Argonne National Laboratory 
 

 
Nuclear technology